Lewie Polk Steinberg (September 13, 1933 – July 21, 2016) was an American musician best known as the original bass guitar player for the soul music group Booker T. & the M.G.'s.

Biography
Steinberg was born in Memphis, Tennessee to Baptist parents. He joined Booker T. & the MG's in 1962. He was featured on "Green Onions" and its B-side, "Behave Yourself", as well as the albums Green Onions and Soul Dressing. Steinberg left the group in 1965 and was replaced by Donald "Duck" Dunn.

Steinberg was inducted into the Rock and Roll Hall of Fame in 1992 and received a Grammy Lifetime Achievement Award in 2007. He lived in Memphis.

Steinberg died from cancer on July 21, 2016, in Memphis, at the age of 82.

References

External links

1933 births
2016 deaths
American bass guitarists
Booker T. & the M.G.'s members
American rhythm and blues bass guitarists
Musicians from Memphis, Tennessee
Guitarists from Tennessee
20th-century American guitarists